The  is a Japanese rapid transit electric multiple unit (EMU) train type operated by Sendai City Transportation Bureau on the Sendai Subway Tōzai Line, which opened in December 2015.

Overview 
The fleet of 15 four-car linear motor-powered EMUs was manufactured by Kinki Sharyo. Construction started in April 2013, with the first set delivered to Arai Depot during fiscal 2014 for testing. The entire fleet of 15 sets (60 vehicles) was delivered before the line opened on 6 December 2015.

Formations 
The four-car trainsets are formed as shown below with car 1 at the Arai end.

The end cars are each fitted with one KP83C single-arm pantograph.

Interior 
Passenger accommodation consists of longitudinal bench seating, with a wheelchair space in each car.

History 
In May 2012, Kinki Sharyo announced that it had received an order to build 15 new four-car 2000 series EMUs for the Sendai Subway Tozai Line. The design of the new trains on order was officially unveiled by the Sendai City Transportation Bureau in November 2012. The first train was shown off to the media at Arai Depot in October 2014.

See also 
 Sendai Subway 1000 series

References

External links 

 Sendai City Transportation Bureau rolling stock details 

Electric multiple units of Japan
Train-related introductions in 2015
Sendai Subway Tozai Line
1500 V DC multiple units of Japan
Kinki Sharyo multiple units